Da'tid Bahrana (with the Persian title Ayande-ye rowshan, lit. "Bright future") was an Assyrian bilingual (Assyrian Neo-Aramaic and Persian) periodical published in Tehran, Iran in 1951. Extant copies are few. One issue is located at Harvard College Library. A full set is possibly stored at the Majles library in Tehran.

Sources
 

Assyrians in Iran
1951 establishments in Iran
1951 disestablishments in Iran
Bilingual magazines
Defunct magazines published in Iran
Magazines published in Tehran
Magazines established in 1951
Magazines disestablished in 1951
Persian-language magazines